Derek Lamar Strong (born February 9, 1968) is an American former professional basketball player who played in ten National Basketball Association (NBA) seasons from 1991 to 2001 for six different teams. A 6'8" forward from Xavier University, Strong was selected by the Philadelphia 76ers in the second round (47th pick overall) of the 1990 NBA draft. Strong has successfully transitioned into stock car racing.

Professional basketball career

Strong played for the Washington Bullets, Milwaukee Bucks, Boston Celtics, Los Angeles Lakers, Orlando Magic and Los Angeles Clippers.

In his NBA career, Strong played in 456 games and scored a total of 3,088 points. His best year as a professional came during the 1997–98 season as a member of the Magic, appearing in 58 games and averaging 12.7 ppg.

In 1992–93, Strong was named the Continental Basketball Association (CBA) Most Valuable Player, while playing with the Quad City Thunder.

Career statistics

NBA

Regular season

|-
| align="left" | 1991–92
| align="left" | Washington
| 1 || 0 || 12.0 || .000 || .000 || .750 || 5.0 || 1.0 || 0.0 || 0.0 || 3.0
|-
| align="left" | 1992–93
| align="left" | Milwaukee
| 23 || 0 || 14.7 || .457 || .500 || .800 || 5.0 || 0.6 || 0.5 || 0.0 || 6.8
|-
| align="left" | 1993–94
| align="left" | Milwaukee
| 67 || 11 || 16.9 || .413 || .231 || .772 || 4.2 || 0.7 || 0.6 || 0.2 || 6.6
|-
| align="left" | 1994–95
| align="left" | Boston
| 70 || 24 || 19.2 || .453 || .286 || .820 || 5.4 || 0.6 || 0.3 || 0.2 || 6.3
|-
| align="left" | 1995–96
| align="left" | L.A. Lakers
| 63 || 0 || 11.8 || .426 || .111 || .812 || 2.8 || 0.5 || 0.3 || 0.2 || 3.4
|-
| align="left" | 1996–97
| align="left" | Orlando
| 82 || 21 || 24.4 || .447 || .000 || .803 || 6.3 || 0.9 || 0.6 || 0.2 || 8.5
|-
| align="left" | 1997–98
| align="left" | Orlando
| 58 || 8 || 28.2 || .420 || .000 || .781 || 7.4 || 0.9 || 0.5 || 0.4 || 12.7
|-
| align="left" | 1998–99
| align="left" | Orlando
| 44 || 0 || 15.8 || .422 || .000 || .717 || 3.7 || 0.4 || 0.3 || 0.2 || 5.1
|-
| align="left" | 1999–00
| align="left" | Orlando
| 20 || 0 || 7.4 || .438 || .250 || .786 || 2.2 || 0.2 || 0.3 || 0.1 || 2.7
|-
| align="left" | 2000–01
| align="left" | L.A. Clippers
| 28 || 8 || 17.5 || .385 || .000 || .757 || 3.9 || 0.3 || 0.5 || 0.0 || 4.2
|- class="sortbottom"
| style="text-align:center;" colspan="2"| Career
| 456 || 72 || 18.7 || .430 || .180 || .786 || 4.9 || 0.6 || 0.4 || 0.2 || 6.8
|}

Playoffs

|-
| align="left" | 1994–95
| align="left" | Boston
| 4 || 1 || 20.3 || .333 || .000 || .500 || 6.0 || 0.8 || 0.8 || 0.3 || 2.8
|-
| align="left" | 1996–97
| align="left" | Orlando
| 5 || 5 || 39.0 || .525 || .000 || .760 || 10.0 || 0.8 || 0.4 || 0.4 || 12.2
|-
| align="left" | 1998–99
| align="left" | Orlando
| 1 || 0 || 16.0 || .500 || .000 || 1.000 || 0.0 || 0.0 || 1.0 || 0.0 || 4.0
|- class="sortbottom"
| style="text-align:center;" colspan="2"| Career
| 10 || 6 || 29.2 || .481 || .000 || .727 || 7.4 || 0.7 || 0.6 || 0.3 || 7.6
|}

College

|-
| align="left" | 1987–88
| align="left" | Xavier
| 30 || - || 22.3 || .569 || .000 || .718 || 7.1 || 0.8 || 0.7 || 0.4 || 10.6
|-
| align="left" | 1988–89
| align="left" | Xavier
| 33 || 31 || 29.8 || .617 || .000 || .817 || 8.0 || 0.5 || 0.8 || 0.5 || 15.3
|-
| align="left" | 1989–90
| align="left" | Xavier
| 33 || 31 || 29.7 || .533 || .000 || .839 || 9.9 || 0.9 || 0.8 || 0.8 || 14.2
|- class="sortbottom"
| style="text-align:center;" colspan="2"| Career
| 96 || 62 || 27.4 || .573 || .000 || .802 || 8.4 || 0.7 || 0.8 || 0.6 || 13.4
|}

NASCAR career

During his tenure in the NBA, Derek was an avid NASCAR fan and remained committed to pursuing this childhood dream when his playing days ended. Strong transitioned into a professional stock car driver and owner of Strong Racing Team Derek is the first NBA player to successfully transition into stock car racing. Strong Racing is  the first team in NASCAR history to have African-American female owners – Dawn Whitaker and Erika Hill. Strong Racing is a Stock Car Racing Team that competes in ASA and NASCAR Racing events. Strong Racing is managed by Stuart Lycett and is based in Los Angeles.

Charities

Strong supports many charities including The Music City Motorsports Institute, a non-profit associated with Strong Racing that seeks to motivate and inspire students to achieve academic success with an educational platform of learning, discovery and fun in the motor sports industry. Co-owner of Strong Racing, Erika Hill is also the co-founder of Peace International, a non-profit organization whose primary mission is to build schools in remote areas throughout the world.

References

External links
Derek Strong NBA statistics, basketballreference.com
Derek Strong interview with Looktothestars.com
Derek Strong's Charity Work
A quick chat with ... Derek Strong
Derek Strong's Final Four pick on SportsIllustrated.com

1968 births
Living people
American expatriate basketball people in Spain
American men's basketball players
Basketball players from Los Angeles
Boston Celtics players
CB Peñas Huesca players
Columbus Riverdragons players
Liga ACB players
Los Angeles Clippers players
Los Angeles Lakers players
Milwaukee Bucks players
Orlando Magic players
Philadelphia 76ers draft picks
Power forwards (basketball)
Quad City Thunder players
United States Basketball League players
Xavier Musketeers men's basketball players
Washington Bullets players